Zellmer is a surname. Notable people with the surname include:

 Eric Zellmer, former guitarist for the band, Gluttons
 Lucas Zellmer (born 1977), German Olympic yacht racer
 Michael Zellmer (born 1977), German Olympic water polo player
 Sandra Zellmer, American lawyer and Professor of Law
 Vicky Zellmer (born 1960), American politician
 Uwe Zellmer, grand-prize winner of the Ludwig-Uhland-Preis literature prize